Mandrillon is a French surname. Notable people with the surname include:

 Camille Mandrillon (1891–1969), French biathlete
 Maurice Mandrillon (1902–1981), French skier
 René Mandrillon (1928–1970), French cross-country skier

French-language surnames